Črna Prst is a mountain in the southeastern Julian Alps, located at the edge of the Triglav National Park. In the interwar period, the mountain ridge marked the border between the Kingdom of Italy and the Kingdom of Yugoslavia.

The floral richness of the vast grassy slopes have fascinated botanists and visitors to the mountain world since the late 18th century, in particular the meadows of flowers on Črna Prst. The exceptionally diverse flora are due to the geography of the ridge, which experiences a mixed alpine and coastal climate, as well as the unique rock composition.

Name 
The Slovene name Črna Prst, meaning 'black soil', is derived from the unusual patch of psilomelane (a dark manganese ore) and dark shaley claystones by the summit, clearly visible from the north-east.

Botany 
One of the first botanists to visit the mountain may have been Franz Xaver von Wulfen, who in 1789 mentions a sample of Geranium argenteum from Črna Prst sent to him by Karl von Zois. It is unlikely that Zois himself visited the mountain, but his pickers definitely did. The reputation of the mountain was consolidated by botanist Žiga Graf by publications on the flora of the mountain in the 1830s. Muzio Tommasini, mayor of Trieste, visited the mountain in 1840, and interest in the flora of the mountain was furthered after Frederick Augustus II of Saxony visited the mountain in 1841.

There are several species that are generally rare in Slovenia, but common on the slopes of Črna Prst, to name a few: white adder’s mouth (Malaxis monophyllos), clasping twistedstalk (Streptopus amplexifolius) and Hieracium prenanthoides grow on the shaded Bohinj side of the mountain. (The latter two can also be found on the sunny southern slopes of the mountain among tall herbs.) The giant bellflower (Campanula latifolia) thrives on the slopes of Lisec in avalanche gullies overgrown with tall herb communities, green alder and sycamore and beech trees.

The slopes of Črna Prst are home to five species of European conservation importance: the short-haired sandwort (Moehringia villosa), the "queen of the Alps" (Eryngium alpinum), the Bertoloni columbine (Aquilegia bertolonii), the yellow lady's slipper orchid (Cypripedium calceolus) and Zois' bellflower (Campanula zoysii).

History 
Between 1920 and 1947, the border between Italy and the Kingdom of Yugoslavia ran along the mountain ridge that surrounds Podbrdo. The Austrian Littoral, later renamed Julian March, was assigned to Italy in 1920 with the Treaty of Rapallo and was then ceded to Yugoslavia in 1947 with the Treaty of Paris.

In 1921, the border was marked with numbered concrete milestones, dated with the year 1920. Military outposts were erected at Črna Prst, Slatnik, Porezen, Grant and Podbrdo. Črna Prst was the highest of the guard huts as, due to the nature of the terrain, no enemy attack was expected further along the ridge; it was only manned in the summer months.

In 1927, the Italians began building military trails from Podbrdo to these strategically important peaks. The routes were built by special military work battalions from the 7th Alpini Regiment consisting of three groups of alpinists and a group of engineers. Construction took place from early spring to late fall; due to the manual methods used by the Italian soldiers (such as shovels, hand-held drills, dynamite), work proceeded very slowly and lasted for several years, despite the large number of soldiers.

After the Second World War, the hut fell into disuse. In 1954, the Mountaineering Association of Most na Soči converted the former Italian military guard hut into a mountain lodge, but it ceased operations in 1958. In 1959, the Alpine Association of Slovenia handed it over to the Mountaineering Association of Podbrdo for management, care and restoration, and over the course of the 1960s, it completely changed its appearance, as the association remodeled, extended and upgraded it. On August 7th, 1966 an opening ceremony was held and the renovated building was named after soldier and mountaineer Zorek Jelenčič. A freight cable car was constructed to aid with maintenance of the hut, with its first ascent taking place on August 3rd, 1976.

Access 
The mountain is located along the red trail of the Via Alpina.

There are several marked hiking trails leading to the summit, namely:

 From Bohinjska Bistrica, past the Orožna mountain hut through the Planina za Liscem.
 From Bohinjska Bistrica, optionally up an asphalt road through Ravne, and then through Planina za Črno goro.
 From Podbrdo, past the village of Trtnik and over the Čez Suho pass.
 From Podbrdo, through the village of Bača and over the Vrh Bača saddle.

Alternatively, a significant portion of the way up the mountain can be walked along regional roads:

 Paved local road from Hudajužna, through Stržišče.
 Regional road from Škofja Loka via Petrovo Brdo.
 Regional asphalt road from Most na Soči via Petrovo Brdo.

References

External links 

 Črna prst on Hike.uno
 Črna prst na strani planinskega društva Podbrdo
 Interactive 360° panorama from the summit
 Črna prst na Mountainsgeek.com

One-thousanders of Slovenia
Mountains of the Julian Alps